Dobrotić is a village within the municipality of Prokuplje, in Toplica District, Serbia. According to the 2002 census, the village has a population of 37 people.

References

Populated places in Toplica District